Labaroche is a commune in the Haut-Rhin department in Grand Est in north-eastern France.

It is located in the Vosges mountains at an average altitude of 750 m. There is a post-office, a bank, several hotels, a little super-market, a salon de the, 2 boulangeries, and an interesting museum, Le Musée des métiers du bois. To the south of the village, on top of a mountain called Petit Hohnack, stands the ruin of a medieval castle.

See also
 Communes of the Haut-Rhin département

References

External links

Information, pictures and weather

Communes of Haut-Rhin